European Communities Act 1972 can refer to:

 European Communities Act 1972 (UK) which was repealed in 2020
 European Communities Act 1972 (Ireland)